The term Joyita can refer to: 

MV Joyita A merchant vessel and site of the mysterious disappearance of 25 people in 1955.
La Joyita Prison a prison in Panama.